York Road may refer to:

Roads

Asia
 York Road, Hong Kong in Kowloon Tong

Australia
 York Road, Western Australia, an early name for portions of the Great Eastern Highway

Europe
 York Way, Islington, London, formerly named York Road (until 1938)
 York Road, Lambeth, London

North America
United States
 York Road (Baltimore), a major road heading north from Baltimore, Maryland
 Old York Road, formerly York Road, connecting Philadelphia with New York City via New Jersey

Canada
 Niagara Regional Road 81, known as York Road in Queenston, Ontario
 York Boulevard in Hamilton, Ontario
 Ontario Highway 2 historically had been known as York Road for portions of the Kingston-Toronto route
 Royal York Road (and associated tube station) in Etobicoke, Toronto, Ontario

Transit
 York Road (rail), a railway depot in Belfast, Northern Ireland; originally one of the city's main stations, it has been replaced by Yorkgate Station
 York Road tube station, a disused station on the London Underground
 King's Cross York Road, a former railway station located close to the Underground station

Structures
 York Road (Maidenhead), a football (soccer) stadium in Maidenhead, England, home of Maidenhead United F.C.